Walter Fisch (16 February 1910 – 21 December 1966) was a German politician of the Communist Party (KPD) and former member of the German Bundestag.

Life 
From 1949 to 1953 he was a member of the first German Bundestag.

Literature

References

1910 births
1966 deaths
Members of the Bundestag for Hesse
Members of the Bundestag 1949–1953
Communist Party of Germany politicians
Members of the Bundestag for the Communist Party of Germany